William Hughes (9 May 1929 – June 2005) was a Northern Irish footballer who played as a right winger.

Career
Born in Ballymena, Hughes played for Larne, Bolton Wanderers, Bournemouth and Boscombe Athletic, Rhyl, Bangor City and Mossley. He also earned one cap for the Northern Ireland national team.

References

1929 births
2005 deaths
Association footballers from Northern Ireland
Northern Ireland international footballers
Larne F.C. players
Bolton Wanderers F.C. players
AFC Bournemouth players
Rhyl F.C. players
Bangor City F.C. players
Mossley A.F.C. players
NIFL Premiership players
English Football League players
Association football wingers
Expatriate association footballers from Northern Ireland
Expatriate footballers in England
Expatriate footballers in Wales
Sportspeople from Ballymena